An electoral quota is an election threshold.

Types of electoral quotas:

 Hare quota
 Droop quota
 Imperiali quota
 Hagenbach-Bischoff quota